That's How You Know may refer to:

"That's How You Know" (Disney song), 2007
"That's How You Know" (Nico & Vinz song), 2014
"That's How You Know (When You're in Love)" (1995), by Lari White